The 2010 Danish Individual Speedway Championship was the 2010 edition of the Danish Individual Speedway Championship. The final was staged over two rounds, at Esbjerg and Holsted, and was won by Kenneth Bjerre. It was the first time Bjerre had ever won the national title.

Event format 
The competition started with two quarter finals, with three progressing to the semi-final from the first and four from the second. The top nine then officially qualified from the semi-final, joining six seeded riders and a wild card in the final series. The final series was held over two rounds, with the top four scorers from the two rounds then competing in a Grand Final. The points from the Grand Final were then added to the total score and the overall winner was the rider with the most total points.

Quarter finals

Semi-final

Final series

Final classification

References 

Denmark